This page is a list of known winners of the Terence Judd Award, which was set up in memory of the British pianist Terence Judd '...to further the careers of outstanding young professional pianists....'

Another apparent winner is the pianist Philip Hosford, though the year he won is unclear.

Notes 

Music award winners
Lists of award winners